Kathlow (Sorbian:Kótłow)  is a small village in Neuhausen/Spree municipality in the district of Spree-Neiße in Brandenburg state, Germany. The population as of 31 December 2012 was 138.

Location
Latitude: 51° 43' 0" N
Longitude: 14° 28' 60" E
20.6 km west of Forst

Population history 
271 (1875)    
243 (1890)     
232 (1910)    
277 (1925)     
250 (1933)     
276 (1946)     
161 (1993)     
164 (1994)     
162 (1995)     
162 (1996)     
181 (1997)     
176 (1998)     
182 (1999)    
182 (2000)     
176 (2001)    
169 (2002)    
169 (2003)     
184 (2006)

Unlike most rural settlements in the former East Germany, the population of Kathlow after the reunification of East Germany and West Germany in 1990 has been at times growing and at times declining.

References

External links
Magnetic-declination.com

Villages in Brandenburg